Attack Squadron 155 or VA-155 was an Attack Squadron of the U.S. Navy. It was established on 1 September 1987 and disestablished on 30 April 1993. It was the third squadron to be named VA-155, the first VA-155 was disestablished on 30 November 1949 and second VA-155 was originally established in 1946, redesignated as VA-155 on 4 February 1953, and disestablished on 30 September 1977. Its nickname, shared with the second VA-155 was the Silver Foxes.

Operational history
15 August–8 October 1988: , with VA-155 embarked, conducted a change of home port transit from Norfolk to San Diego via Cape Horn. During the transit numerous airpower demonstrations were conducted for dignitaries from various South American countries.
17 January 1991: The squadron conducted its first combat operations. VA-155’s commanding officer, Commander Sweigart, led Air Wing Two’s aircraft in its first strike against Iraq.
18 January 1991: The squadron suffered its first and only loss during the war with Iraq when one of its A-6E Intruders was shot down while on a mining sortie by the Um Qasr Naval Base in Iraq.
28 February 1991: ’s last combat strike of the Gulf War was launched and led by a VA-155 aircraft. During the 43-day Gulf War the squadron flew 1,388.4 hours, a total of 635 sorties, and delivered 2,289,940 pounds of ordnance on Iraqi military targets.
September–December 1992: Squadron aircraft flew sorties in support of Operation Southern Watch, flights over southern Iraq south of the 32nd parallel to ensure Iraq was adhering to United Nations sanctions.
December 1992: The squadron participated in Operation Restore Hope, flying sorties in support of the humanitarian relief effort in Somalia.

Home port assignments
The squadron was assigned to NAS Whidbey Island for all its time in service.

Aircraft assignment
The squadron first received the following aircraft on the dates shown:
 KA-6D Intruder – 16 Nov 1987
 A-6E Intruder – Dec 1987

See also
 Attack aircraft
 List of inactive United States Navy aircraft squadrons
 History of the United States Navy

References

External links

Attack squadrons of the United States Navy
Wikipedia articles incorporating text from the Dictionary of American Naval Aviation Squadrons
Military units and formations disestablished in 1993